Research in Social Movements, Conflicts and Change is a peer-reviewed book series that covers sociological research on social conflict, social movements, collective behavior, and social change. The journal also publishes reviews of books on these topics. It was established in 1977 and is published by Emerald Group Publishing.

The journal's founding editor-in-chief was Louis Kriesberg (Syracuse University). Since 2010, the editor is Patrick G. Coy (Kent State University).

External links 
 
Publications established in 1977
Sociology journals
Works about social movements
Emerald Group Publishing academic journals
English-language journals
Monographic series